Tobias Arwidson born on  is a Swedish biathlete.

He competed in the 2014 Winter Olympics for Sweden where he finished 42nd in the sprint.

He is the son of Lars-Göran Arwidson.

References

External links 
Sochi Olympic Profile

1988 births
Biathletes at the 2014 Winter Olympics
Living people
Olympic biathletes of Sweden
People from Mora Municipality
Swedish male biathletes
21st-century Swedish people